Andrei Nikolayevich Bezhonov (born 6 April 1993) is a Russian football player.

Club career
He made his debut in the Russian Professional Football League for FC Dynamo Bryansk on 25 August 2016 in a game against FC Arsenal-2 Tula.

In 2018 he played in Spanish lower leagues for CF Can Vidalet and CD Torrevieja.

References

External links
 Profile by Russian Professional Football League
 
 

1993 births
Living people
Russian footballers
Association football midfielders
Russian expatriate footballers
Expatriate footballers in Latvia
Expatriate footballers in Belarus
Expatriate footballers in Spain
Crimean Premier League players
Ilūkstes NSS players
FC Shakhtyor Soligorsk players
FC Dynamo Bryansk players
CD Torrevieja players
FC Belshina Bobruisk players
FC Sputnik Rechitsa players